Vincelette is a surname. Notable people with the surname include:

Alfred Vincelette (1935–1997), American skier
Dan Vincelette (born 1967), Canadian ice hockey player